Olivia is the county seat of Renville County, Minnesota, United States. Its population was 2,484 at the 2010 census.

History
Olivia was platted in 1878, and named for a female station agent named Olive, according to local history. A post office has been in operation at Olivia since 1879. The county seat moved from Beaver Falls to Olivia in 1900.

Geography

U.S. Highways 71 and 212 are two of the main routes in the city.

Demographics

2010 census
As of the census of 2010, there were 2,484 people, 1,038 households, and 653 families living in the city. The racial makeup of the city was 93.9% White, 1.0% African American, 0.4% Native American, 0.2% Asian, 3.7% from other races, and 0.8% from two or more races. Hispanic or Latino of any race were 8.3% of the population.

There were 1,038 households, of which 28.0% had children under the age of 18 living with them, 47.6% were married couples living together, 10.8% had a female householder with no husband present, 4.5% had a male householder with no wife present, and 37.1% were non-families. 31.9% of all households were made up of individuals, and 13.1% had someone living alone who was 65 years of age or older. The average household size was 2.28 and the average family size was 2.85.

The median age in the city was 40.8 years. 23.7% of residents were under the age of 18; 7.7% were between the ages of 18 and 24; 23.1% were from 25 to 44; 25.5% were from 45 to 64; and 19.9% were 65 years of age or older. The gender makeup of the city was 49.2% male and 50.8% female.

2000 census
As of the census of 2000, there were 2,570 people, 1,075 households, and 658 families living in the city. The racial makeup of the city was 96.19% White, 0.12% African American, 0.12% Native American, 0.12% Asian, 2.57% from other races, and 0.89% from two or more races. Hispanic or Latino of any race were 7.63% of the population.

There were 1,075 households, out of which 28.2% had children under the age of 18 living with them, 52.2% were married couples living together, 6.1% had a female householder with no husband present, and 38.7% were non-families. 35.1% of all households were made up of individuals, and 18.1% had someone living alone who was 65 years of age or older.  The average household size was 2.30 and the average family size was 3.00.

In the city, the population was spread out, with 24.7% under the age of 18, 7.2% from 18 to 24, 23.5% from 25 to 44, 22.8% from 45 to 64, and 21.8% who were 65 years of age or older.  The median age was 41 years. For every 100 females, there were 93.2 males.  For every 100 females age 18 and over, there were 92.4 males.

The median income for a household in the city was $35,060, and the median income for a family was $44,781. Males had a median income of $31,793 versus $25,541 for females. The per capita income for the city was $17,889.  About 6.0% of families and 11.3% of the population were below the poverty line, including 17.2% of those under age 18 and 10.6% of those age 65 or over.

Education
Olivia's school system is partnered with Bird Island and Lake Lillian, and operates under the name BOLD Schools (Bird Island, Olivia, Lake Lillian District). The school mascot is the BOLD Warrior. The BOLD high school is in Olivia and the elementary school is in Bird Island. Bird Island also has a Catholic school.

Corn Capital of the World
The Minnesota Senate has designated Olivia the "Corn Capital of the World". Olivia has been calling itself the "Corn Capital of the World" since 1973, when it erected its well-known 50-foot corn monument in the shape of an ear of corn.

Olivia is the home to nine seed research facilities. It is in the middle of Renville County, Minnesota's leading producer of corn.

Corn Capital Days 
Olivia celebrates Corn Capital Days during the last weekend of July. Activities include a parade, corncob toss, corn-lympics, free corn feed, kiddie parade, Lion's walk-in, fly-in, drive-in breakfast, and live music.

Notable people
Blix Donnelly (1914–1976), baseball player
Michael J. Dowling (1866-1921), Speaker of the Minnesota House of Representatives
Darwin Hall (1844-1919), Minnesota state legislator
Paul F. Heard (1913–1964), producer, director, and scriptwriter of religious films
Roger Reinert (born 1970), member of the Minnesota Senate
Thomas Joseph Simmons (1932-2002), Minnesota state legislator and lawyer
Kathleen Winsor (1919–2003), author of Forever Amber

Media

Television

References

External links

City Website
Olivia Chamber of Commerce site

Cities in Minnesota
Cities in Renville County, Minnesota
County seats in Minnesota